The year 1932 was marked, in science fiction, by the following events.

Births and deaths

Births 
 September 28 : Michael Coney, British writer (died in 2005).
 November 7 : Vladimir Volkoff, French writer (died in 2005).
 November 8 : Ben Bova, American writer (died in 2020).
 August 15 : Robert Forward, American writer (died in 2002).

Deaths

Events

Literary releases

Novels 
 Cat Country, by Lao She.
 Brave New World, by Aldous Huxley.

Stories collections

Short stories 
 The Cities of Ardathia, by George Henry Weiss.

Comics

Audiovisual outputs

Movies 
 Island of Lost Souls, by Erle C. Kenton.

Awards 
The main science-fiction Awards known at the present time did not exist at this time.

See also 
 1932 in science
 1931 in science fiction
 1933 in science fiction

References

Science fiction by year

science-fiction